The Sanford Wilson House is a historic house in Montgomery County, Tennessee. It was built in 1840 for Sanford Wilson, a planter and slave owner. It was inherited by his son Samuel in 1848, followed by Samuel's son, also named Samuel, in 1860. The Wilsons remained prosperous after the American Civil War; by 1890, they owned 3,050 acres.

The house was designed in the Federal architectural style. It has been listed on the National Register of Historic Places since September 13, 1978.

References

Houses on the National Register of Historic Places in Tennessee
National Register of Historic Places in Montgomery County, Tennessee
Federal architecture in Tennessee
Houses completed in 1840